Tahmina Begum (born 1993) is an English football referee and PE assistant. In 2010, she became the first qualified female referee of Bangladeshi descent in the United Kingdom.

Education and career
In 2010, at the age of 17, Begum was part of a group of 12 that passed a referee course organised by the Bangladesh Football Association (BFA). She became the first qualified female referee of Bangladeshi descent in the UK, she was the only female on the course and had to convince her parents to do the course. Since then she has been officiating in BFA football matches and other local leagues in East London.

Begum is a trained basketball coach. She has achieved the Community Sports Leaders Award (CSLA), which secured her a job as a PE assistant and multi-sports coach at a primary school in Tower Hamlets. She is one of the deputy Young  Mayors of Tower Hamlets. She is currently studying at University of Greenwich.

Awards
In October 2010, Begum was awarded the Chelsea Community Sports Award for Football In The Community at the GG2 Leadership and Diversity Awards. In January 2014, she was nominated for the Best at Sport award at the British Muslim Awards.

Personal life
After being selected through the London Organising Committee of the Olympic and Paralympic Games programme to be an Olympic torchbearer in recognition of her sporting achievements. On 21 July 2012, Begum carried the Olympic Torch in Stepney Green, London.

See also
British Asians in association football
British Bangladeshi
List of British Bangladeshis
List of football referees

References

External links
Tahmina Begum . London 2012. 21 July 2012

1993 births
Living people
English Muslims
English people of Bangladeshi descent
English football referees
English sports coaches
People from the London Borough of Tower Hamlets
Alumni of the University of Greenwich
21st-century Bengalis
English women referees and umpires

bn:তাহমিনা আনাম